The 1988–89 NBA season was the Hawks' 40th season in the NBA and 21st season in Atlanta. After falling into the second round of the playoffs for three straight seasons, the Hawks signed free agent and All-Star forward Moses Malone, and acquired Reggie Theus from the Sacramento Kings during the off-season. However, Kevin Willis was out with a broken foot suffered during the preseason, and was later on suspended indefinitely for missing functions and rehabilitation therapy. The Hawks held a 28–19 record at the All-Star break, posted a nine-game winning streak in April, and reached 50 wins for the fourth consecutive season, finishing third in the Central Division with a 52–30 record.

Dominique Wilkins averaged 26.2 points, 6.9 rebounds and 1.5 steals per game, and was named to the All-NBA Third Team, while Malone averaged 20.2 points and 11.8 rebounds per game, and Theus provided the team with 15.8 points, 4.7 assists and 1.4 steals per game. In addition, Doc Rivers provided with 13.6 points, 6.9 assists and 2.4 steals per game, while John Battle contributed 9.5 points per game off the bench, Cliff Levingston averaged 9.2 points and 6.2 rebounds per game, and Jon Koncak contributed 6.1 rebounds and 1.3 blocks per game. Wilkins and Malone were both selected for the 1989 NBA All-Star Game, which was Malone's final All-Star appearance. 

In the Eastern Conference First Round of the playoffs, the Hawks faced off against the 5th-seeded Milwaukee Bucks for the second consecutive year. However, after winning Game 1 at home, 100–92, the Hawks would lose to the Bucks in five games. Following the season, Theus left in the 1989 NBA Expansion Draft after only playing just one season with the Hawks.

Draft picks

Roster

Roster Notes
 Power forward Kevin Willis was suspended indefinitely for missing functions and rehabilitation therapy. Willis was out with a broken foot sustained during the preseason.

Regular season

Season standings

z - clinched division title
y - clinched division title
x - clinched playoff spot

Record vs. opponents

Game log

|-

Playoffs

|- align="center" bgcolor="#ccffcc"
| 1
| April 27
| Milwaukee
| W 100–92
| Dominique Wilkins (28)
| Moses Malone (13)
| Doc Rivers (10)
| Omni Coliseum14,541
| 1–0
|- align="center" bgcolor="#ffcccc"
| 2
| April 29
| Milwaukee
| L 98–108
| Dominique Wilkins (32)
| Moses Malone (8)
| Doc Rivers (8)
| Omni Coliseum15,742
| 1–1
|- align="center" bgcolor="#ffcccc"
| 3
| May 2
| @ Milwaukee
| L 113–117 (OT)
| Dominique Wilkins (30)
| Jon Koncak (11)
| Reggie Theus (5)
| Bradley Center18,469
| 1–2
|- align="center" bgcolor="#ccffcc"
| 4
| May 5
| @ Milwaukee
| W 113–106 (OT)
| Malone, Wilkins (24)
| Moses Malone (17)
| Spud Webb (7)
| Bradley Center18,633
| 2–2
|- align="center" bgcolor="#ffcccc"
| 5
| May 7
| Milwaukee
| L 92–96
| Moses Malone (25)
| Moses Malone (16)
| Rivers, Theus (6)
| Omni Coliseum16,220
| 2–3
|-

Player statistics

Season

Playoffs

Player Statistics Citation:

Awards and records
 Dominique Wilkins, All-NBA Third Team

Transactions

References

See also
 1988-89 NBA season

Atlanta Hawks seasons
Atlanta Haw
Atlanta Haw
Atlanta Hawks